Enormous is an indie, power pop band from Derby, England.

Background
Enormous was formed out of the band Slaughterhouse 5 from Mansfield, England in 1992 by Davy Lawrence (vocals, guitar), Graham Boffey (drums, vocals), David Graham (vocals, bass) and Steve O'Toole (guitar, vocals), later joined in 1996 by Paul Varga (tenor saxophone) and Ashley Morgan (trumpet).

Enormous cite their influences as Ray Davies, Difford & Tilbrook, Burt Bacharach, The Beatles, Nick Lowe and Elvis Costello. Their classic pop songs are reminiscent of Buzzcocks, The Kinks, Squeeze, Madness, The Smiths, The Wonder Stuff, Blur, The Cure, The Divine Comedy, The Teardrop Explodes, and The Clash.

During 1996, David Graham (bass, vocals) left the band to join the Royal Air Force and was replaced by Craig Denholm (bass, vocals). Steve Foster, of Bandwagon Studios, Mansfield, England, brought together four music groups, under one banner named The Red Collective, featuring: Enormous; Ease; The Swells; and The Kerrys. Enormous formed the backbone and were signed to Beatific Records in 1997, recording a various artists compilation album Cigarette Machine From God (1997) at Mansfield's Bandwagon Studios. Their songs were critically acclaimed, receiving music reviews by The Sunday Times and Mojo.

After 2003, Steve O'Toole and Craig Denholm departed and the remaining band members took a three-year break to follow their own projects. By 2006, the band had reformed and was signed by the independent record label, Big Arena Records, for the purpose of re-releasing their entire back catalogue. In 2008, two temporary band members, Steve Giles (bass, vocals) and Stephen Capes (keyboards) were recruited, and the band played a sold-out homecoming gig in Mansfield at the Town Mill venue, on 20 November 2008. New bassist Mike Ridley-Dash joined in December 2009, and Travis Peters (keyboards) joined the band in 2010.

Discography

Compilation albums
Cigarette Machine From God  - The Red Collective (Beatific Records, 1997) B-TIFIC001. ASIN: B000024VW8
It's Gonna Happen
Something In My Heart
When You Do
Happy Birthday, Asshole

Studio albums   
Electric Baby Grand (Big Arena Records, 1999 & 2006)   
It's All Coming True   
Being Very Fair   
Believe Her   
Things I Can't Forget   
Never Coming Back   
You Do Too Much   
Finders Keepers   
Sharon, You're A Shit   
I Tried Everything   
When You Get To Know Me   
Everything Hangs On You   
  
Situation: Comedy (Big Arena Records, 2000 & 2006)   
Let's Run Away Together   
When You Do   
Kill Me, I Love You   
Everything's All Right   
Used   
Sooner Or Later   
Give The Boy A Chance   
Your Weird Stuff   
Happy Birthday, Asshole   
Stand Up   
I Gave Up On Love   
    
Almost Everything (Big Arena Records, 2006)   
Been Around   
The Way That It Should Be   
Something In My Heart   
Fingers And Thumbs   
Right Behind You   
It Would Be Good   
Still Believe   
The Two Of Us   
My Type   
I'm Your Biggest Fan   
It's Gonna Happen

Singles and EPs
My Type (EP UK, Beatific Records, 1998) B-TIFIC002
My Type
Something In My Heart
Your Weird Stuff
I Gave Up On Love
   
Let's Run Away Together (EP UK, Big Arena Records, 2000 & 2006)   
Let's Run Away Together   
When You Get To Know Me   
Sharon, You're A Shit     

Been Around (EP UK, Big Arena Records, 2006)   
Been Around   
Me And My Big Mouth   
    
It Would Be Good (EP UK, Big Arena Records, 2006)   
It Would Be Good   
My Type (Thrash Mix)    

Something In My Heart (EP UK, Big Arena Records, 2006)   
Something In My Heart   
Things She Did   
Poor Me   

The Way That It Should Be (EP UK, Big Arena Records, 2006)   
The Way That It Should Be   
Come Back Baby

Live coverage
The Old Bell Hotel, Derby, UK (8 October 2010)
The Vaults, Derby, UK (23 September 2010)
Bar One, Derby, UK (30 July 2010)
The Friary Hotel, Derby, UK (27 July 2010)
Town Mill, Mansfield, UK (20 November 2008)

References

External links
 
 Enormous Reloaded

English indie rock groups
English power pop groups
Musical groups established in 1992